George Albert Krol (born 1956) is a United States foreign service officer and career member of the Senior Foreign Service with the rank of Minister-Counselor. Krol formerly served as  United States Ambassador to Kazakhstan. A position he was sworn in to on January 8, 2015.

Personal life

Krol's home state is New Jersey. He is the youngest of three sons of Anthony J. Krol of Manchester Township, New Jersey.

He attended St. Peter's Preparatory School in Jersey City, New Jersey, and received a bachelor's degree in history, magna cum laude, from Harvard University, and bachelor's and master's degrees in philosophy, politics and economics from Oxford University, England.

Krol is married to Melissa Welch.

Career

Krol joined the United States Foreign Service in 1982, and is a career member of the Senior Foreign Service. He held foreign assignments in Poland, India, the Soviet Union, Russia, Ukraine and in Belarus. 
He served as Minister-Counselor for Political Affairs at the United States Embassy in Moscow (1999–2002) and  
He served as Deputy Chief of Mission and Chargé d'affaires in Minsk, Belarus (1993–1995). 
His Washington assignments include Deputy Assistant Secretary for the Bureau of South and Central Asian Affairs,  Director of the Office of Russian Affairs (1997–1999) and Special Assistant to the Ambassador-at-Large for the New Independent States (1995–1997). Krol taught at the National War College and was a member of the State Department's Senior Seminar. He received several State Department Superior and Meritorious Honor awards. He speaks Russian and Polish.

He served as the U.S. Ambassador to Uzbekistan 2011-2014 and as the Ambassador to Belarus 2003–2006.

Ambassador Krol served as United States Ambassador to Kazakhstan from 2015 to 2018. He was awarded the Order of Dostyk (the Order of Friendship) by the President of Kazakhstan, Nursultan Nazarbayev, in September 2018 and the Belarusian Democratic Republic 100th Jubilee Medal in 2019.

References

External links

|-

|-

1956 births
Living people
Ambassadors of the United States to Belarus
Ambassadors of the United States to Kazakhstan
Ambassadors of the United States to Uzbekistan
Harvard University alumni
People from Manchester Township, New Jersey
St. Peter's Preparatory School alumni
United States Foreign Service personnel
Alumni of the University of Oxford